Søren Gade Jensen (born 27 January 1963) is a Danish politician who has been Speaker of the Folketing since November 2022, representing the Liberal party, Venstre. He was a Liberal member of the Folketing from 2001 to 2019 and again in 2022. Before entering politics, he was a military officer and businessman. He was formerly a Member of the European Parliament from 2019 to 2022.

He was also CEO of the Danish business organization Landbrug & Fødevarer from 2012 to 2014.

Political career
Gade served as Defence Minister from 2004 to 2010, when he replaced Svend Aage Jensby. During his time in office, he led Danish efforts to maintain public support for the deployment of 750 troops in Afghanistan. Gade resigned his position due to a long time conflict with the media after the publishing of a fake Arabic translation of Thomas Rathsack's book, telling the defence's methods in the Afghan war.

Gade was elected to the European Parliament in 2019. A member of the Renew Europe group, he has since been serving as chair of the Committee on Fisheries and as member of the Committee on Transport and Tourism. In 2020, he also joined the Special Committee on Beating Cancer.

In addition to his committee assignments, Gade is Chair of the Parliament's delegation for relations with India.

In 2022 following his re-election to the Folketing, a majority of parties supported Gade's candidacy for the position of speaker of the Folketing. Gade was officially confirmed as speaker on 16 November 2022.

Controversy
In 2015, newspaper Jyllands-Posten published a document that it said proved that Gade tried to hide the Danish military's agreement with security company Blackwater whose contractors killed 17 Iraqi civilians and wounded 20 in Baghdad's Nisour Square in 2007.

Other activities
 European Leadership Network (ELN), Member of the Advisory Board

Personal life
In January 2008 Gade lost his wife Helle Buskbjerg Poulsen after years of cancer.

Awards and decorations

References

External links
 Biography on the website of the Danish Parliament (Folketinget)

1963 births
Living people
People from Holstebro
Venstre (Denmark) politicians
Danish Defence Ministers
Aarhus University alumni
MEPs for Denmark 2019–2024
Members of the Folketing 2001–2005
Members of the Folketing 2005–2007
Members of the Folketing 2007–2011
Members of the Folketing 2015–2019
Members of the Folketing 2022–2026